The Nangun is a variation of the application of the "northern Chinese staff", which is featured in contemporary wushu exercises and forms.  It is based on staff techniques coming from Southern Chinese martial arts. Its movements stress hitting, in contrast to the cutting and swinging techniques of the northern staff.

See also
 Gun (staff)

References

Chinese martial arts terminology
Chinese melee weapons
Stick-fighting
Events in wushu